The Winsor School is a 5–12 private, college-preparatory day school for girls in Boston, Massachusetts, United States. It was established in 1886.

It competes in the Eastern Independent League and is featured on the Boston Women's Heritage Trail. In late 2007, The Wall Street Journal identified it as one of the world's top 50 schools for its success in preparing students to enter top American universities. In April 2010, it was named one of the top 10 prep schools in America by Forbes. In 2018, Niche.com ranked it as the best all-girls school in the United States, the 15th best private school in the country, and the 2nd best high school in the Boston area.

History 
In 1886, Mary Pickard Winsor started a six-month school in Boston for her aunt's daughter and friends. Winsor, who had been teaching at her mother's school in Winchester, began with eight little girls in a private home on Beacon Hill. She quickly established a viable and growing school for girls, bearing her name, and began sending its graduates to college in 1895. She established the present structure of eight classes, grades 5–12, offering a ninth, graduate, year (which has since been discontinued).

"Miss Winsor's School" occupied a number of different locations on the Hill until a group of parents asked her to be the director of the school they intended to build. They hoped to secure for children in private schools "at least equivalent advantages given to those in the Public Schools, as to fire-proof construction, light, ventilation, and other sanitary arrangements." They formed a corporation in 1907, bought land on the Fenway, and hired the Boston architect R. Clipston Sturgis to build "the most perfect schoolhouse." It included a library, science laboratories, art studios, and a gymnasium and swimming tank. The students and alumnae requested that the new school be named for Miss Winsor. President Eliot of Harvard, who was very supportive of the project, suggested the motto "A sound mind in a sound body."

In 1910, the Winsor School opened with 225 students. Winsor continued as head of the school until 1922. She wanted to prepare women to be self-sufficient and self-supporting, and hoped they would be competent, responsible, and generous-minded. She influenced the growth of her school and showed continued interest in it until her death in 1950.

Academics 
Winsor has a reputation for strong academic excellence and has the ideology that its students "should be taught to think and learn independently in order to gain the competence and confidence necessary to be lifelong learners and strong, courageous women."

In the Upper School, Winsor requires its students to take four years of English classes and a minimum of: three years of a language, three years of mathematics, two and a half years of history, two and a half years of science, two and a half years of arts, seven semesters of physical education, and three semesters of health and wellness.

Students must also complete the Global Studies program during one semester of their junior year. Students can take both literature and history courses in either Africa, China, India, the Middle East, or Russia, and these courses culminate in an end-of-semester research paper on a specific regional topic.

The school offers many opportunities for its students to engage in STEM fields including electives like engineering design courses that introduce skills such as coding, computer-aided design (CAD), and 3D printing.

Winsor offers 12 AP courses.

Arts 
Fifth and sixth graders have drama, arts, and theatre classes interwoven into their schedules. In seventh and eighth grades, however, students can take a wide variety of art electives that include sculpture, Shakespeare performance, dance, set design, painting, digital art, and more.

In the Upper School, Winsor offers electives in drama, dance, visual art, and music. More specifically, drama courses consist of acting, directing, and theatre tech. Dance electives consist of both group and independent dance. Visual art courses consist of painting, drawing, architecture, printmaking, ceramics, photography, and art history. Music electives consist of chamber orchestra, guitar, percussion, music technology, and piano. Winsor also has a choir called Small Chorus and an all-senior a cappella group called Senior Small.

Winsor students frequently put on theatre productions in collaboration with students from the Belmont Hill School and the Roxbury Latin School.

Athletics 
Winsor has a range of sports teams on the varsity, junior varsity, and middle school levels.

Fall athletic offerings
 Cross country
 Field hockey
 Volleyball
 Soccer
 Crew
Winter athletic offerings
 Basketball
 Hockey
 Squash
 Swimming
 Curling (Club)
 Skiing (Club)
Spring athletic offerings
 Track
 Softball
 Crew
 Lacrosse
 Tennis
 Sailing
 Golf (club)

Facilities 
The school has expanded its facilities over the years, including a turf playing field in 2008, a full gymnasium in the 1920s, a science wing in the 1980s, expanding the library more than once, adding classrooms in the 1990s, reconstructing a new dining hall, classrooms, laboratories, and faculty workspace in 2004, and most recently, renovating many classrooms, offices, and corridors. The Winsor Dining Services is My School Dining.

They have recently finished building a new addition to the school, costing upwards of $80,000,000. This addition has included a new gym, workout facilities, as well as new music and performing arts facilities. This building is called The Lubin O'Donnell Center for the Performing Arts, Athletics, and Wellness.

Notable alumnae 

 Helenka Pantaleoni, silent film actress, humanitarian, and a founder of the U.S. Fund for UNICEF
 Barbara "Babe" Cushing Mortimer Paley, socialite and style icon
 Tenley Albright, Olympic figure skater and surgeon
 Lorraine Hanlon, U.S. national champion figure skater and physician
 Martha Field, third U.S. Supreme Court female law clerk and professor
 Laurie Glimcher, physician-scientist and first woman president of Dana–Farber Cancer Institute
 Gale Brewer, current Borough President of Manhattan
 Lisa Monaco, federal prosecutor and Homeland Security Adviser to President Barack Obama
 Leslie Dewan, nuclear engineer
 Eleanor Ruggles, biographer and book reviewer
 Mariama White-Hammond, minister and community activist
 Genevra Stone, Olympic rower
 Emi Ferguson, flutist, performer, singer, composer, and professor

References 

Middle schools in Boston
High schools in Boston
Girls' schools in Massachusetts
Private middle schools in Massachusetts
Private high schools in Massachusetts
Educational institutions established in 1886
1886 establishments in Massachusetts